A Vision of Doom: Poems by Ambrose Bierce is a collection of poems by Ambrose Bierce and edited by Donald Sidney-Fryer. It was published in 1980 by Donald M. Grant, Publisher, Inc. in an edition of 900 copies.

Contents

 "A Visionary of Doom", by Donald Sidney-Fryer
 "Basilica"
 "A Mystery"
 "The Passing Show"
 "Geotheos"
 "Invocation"
 "Religion"
 "T.A.H."
 "Contemplation"
 "The Golden Age"
 "A Learner"
 "A Possibility"
 "J.F.B."
 "The Death of Grant"
 "Laus Lucis"
 "Nanine"
 "To My Laundress"
 "Reminded"
 "Another Way"
 "To One Across the Way"
 "To Maude"
 "Tempora Mutantur"
 "To Nanine"
 "Restored"
 "Presentiment"
 "A Study in Gray"
 "Montefiore"
 "Francine"
 "One Morning"
 "The King of Bores"
 "Something in the Papers"
 "The Bride"
 "Again"
 "Oneiromancy"
 "Justice"
 "Creation"
 "Avalon"
 "A Vision of Doom"
 "The Perverted Village"
 "To Dog"
 "A Rational Anthem"
 "A Voluptuary"
 "Arbor Day"
 "Californian Summer Pictures"
 "The Foot–Hill Resort"
 "To the Happy Hunting Grounds"
 "Light Lie the Earth Upon His Dear Dead Heart"
 "Saralthia's Soliloquy"
 "Song of the Dead Body"
 "On Stone"
 "Dead"
 "Man is Long Ages Dead"

References

1980 poetry books
American poetry collections
Books published posthumously
Works by Ambrose Bierce
Donald M. Grant, Publisher books